Francisco Luís Palmeiro Rodrigues (16 October 1932 – 22 January 2017), known as Palmeiro, was a Portuguese footballer who played as a forward.

Club career
Palmeiro was born in Arronches, Portalegre District. During eight years of his senior career he played with Primeira Liga side S.L. Benfica, leaving in 1961 after the emergence of Eusébio. Over the course of nine seasons, he amassed competition totals of 136 games and 41 goals – he also represented Atlético Clube de Portugal in the top level of Portuguese football – and won three national championships and as many Portuguese Cups with his main club.

Palmeiro was the first player to score a goal at the original Estádio da Luz, and was also the first Benfica player to do so in the European Cup, in a match against Sevilla FC in the 1957–58 campaign.

International career
On 3 June 1956, Palmeiro earned the first of three caps for Portugal, in a friendly with Spain. He scored all of his team's goals, in a 3–1 win in Lisbon.

Honours
Benfica
Primeira Liga: 1954–55, 1956–57, 1959–60
Taça de Portugal: 1954–55, 1956–57, 1958–59

References

External links

1932 births
2017 deaths
Portuguese footballers
Association football forwards
Primeira Liga players
Liga Portugal 2 players
S.L. Benfica footballers
Atlético Clube de Portugal players
Portugal international footballers
Sportspeople from Portalegre District